Thorn Creek Wildlife Management Area, is located about 7 miles south of Franklin, West Virginia in Pendleton County.

The WMA is accessed from Thorn Creek Road about 4 miles off U.S. 219, south of Franklin.

Hunting and Fishing

Hunting opportunities in Thorn Creek WMA include deer, squirrel, and turkey .

Thorn Creek is limited to fly fishing in the trout-filled Thorn Creek.

Rustic camping is not available at the WMA.

See also

Animal conservation
Hunting
fishing
List of West Virginia wildlife management areas

References

External links
West Virginia DNR District 2 Wildlife Management Areas
West Virginia Hunting Regulations
West Virginia Fishing Regulations
WVDNR map of Thorn Creek Wildlife Management Area

Wildlife management areas of West Virginia
Protected areas of Pendleton County, West Virginia
IUCN Category V